Aydıncık Lighthouse is a Mediterranean lighthouse in Mersin Province, Turkey.

The lighthouse is an unattended lighthouse. Its visibility is 5 nautical miles

References

Lighthouses in Turkey
Aydıncık District (Mersin)
Mersin Province